Haiman is a surname. Notable persons with the surname include:
John Haiman (born 1946), American linguist
Mark Haiman, mathematician 
Robert J. Haiman, journalist
Jamitofu Haiman, a character from "Zeta Gundam", see List of Mobile Suit Zeta Gundam characters

See also 
Hayman
Heiman
Heyman
Aiman
Hyman